Aballay is a 2010 Argentine action drama film written and directed by Fernando Spiner. The film was selected as the Argentine entry for the Best Foreign Language Film at the 84th Academy Awards, but it did not make the final shortlist.

Cast
 Pablo Cedrón as Aballay
 Nazareno Casero as Julián
 Claudio Rissi as El Muerto
 Mariana Anghileri as Juana
 Luis Ziembrowski as Torres
 Aníbal Guiser as Mercachifle
 Lautaro Delgado as Ángel
 Tobías Mitre as Julián Niño
 Horacio Fontova as Cordobés
 Gabriel Goity as Cura

See also
 List of submissions to the 84th Academy Awards for Best Foreign Language Film
 List of Argentine submissions for the Academy Award for Best Foreign Language Film

References

External links
 

2010 films
2010 action drama films
2010s Spanish-language films
Argentine action drama films
2010s Argentine films